Maharaja Kehri Singh (September 1766 – 28 March 1778) was the ruling Maharaja of Bharatpur state (r.1769 – 1778 CE).

Crowning
He ascended to throne after the death of Maharaja Ratan Singh in 1769.

References 

Rulers of Bharatpur state
1766 births
1778 deaths
Jat rulers
Jat